is the fourth single released by the Japanese boyband Kanjani Eight. The double-A side single features two songs that are on two separate albums. Osaka Obachan Rock is featured on their second album, KJ2 Zukkoke Dai Dassō while Osaka Romanesque originally appeared on KJ1 F.T.O. The difference is that the single version has a 24-second lead.

The limited edition of the single came with a mini poster while the regular edition featured a seven-page booklet.

Track listing

Regular Edition
 " Osaka Obachan Rock "
 " Osaka Romanesque "
 " Kitto, Itsuka... "
 " Osaka Obachan Rock <Original Karaoke> "
 " Osaka Romanesque <Original Karaoke> "

Limited Edition
 " Osaka Obachan Rock "
 " Osaka Romanesque "
 " Osaka Obachan Rock <Original Karaoke> "
 " Osaka Romanesque <Original Karaoke> "

Charts

2005 singles
Kanjani Eight songs